Amarnath Vidyalankar (8 December 1901 – 21 September 1985) was an Indian politician, social worker and journalist. He was involved in the independence movement and became a member of the Indian National Congress before India's independence in 1947. After independence, Vidyalankar served as Minister of Education, Labor and Languages in the Government of Punjab from 1957 to 1962 and a member of the First (1952–1956), Third (1962–1967) and Fifth (1971–1977) Lok Sabhas.

Early life 
Vidylankar was born in Bhera, Shahpur District (now Sargodha District), in pre-partition India on 8 December 1901. The only son of Aruri Mal urf-Parmanand, he was born into a lower-middle-class family. Vidylankar's father was involved in the Arya Samaj movement, frequently attending lectures of Arya Samaj leaders such as Lala Lajpat Rai.

Vidyalankar was educated at Gurukul Kangri Vishwavidyalaya, an Arya Samaj educational institution, for 14 years. 

His school was influenced by Mahatma Munshiram, later known as Swami Shraddhanand. Munshiram, a political progressive, was a follower of Dayananda Saraswati and believed in a free India. Many revolutionaries from Bengal and Punjab were sheltered at Vidyalankar's school, influencing the students. When Viceroy Chelmsford visited the school, a condition of his visit (after the Delhi bomb case) was that no officers accompanying him could be armed; according to Vidyalankar, the students were proud of their insistence on nonviolence.

They were also influenced by Lokmanya Tilak and the Indian National Congress freedom fighters. According to Vidyalankar, Munshiram kept in touch with his students and influenced their character and behavior. Leaders such as Swami Shraddhanand, Lala Lajpat Rai, Madan Mohan Malaviya and Mahatma Gandhi maintained relationships with young students and were interested in developing their lives and character.

Indian independence movement 
After Vidyalankar completed his education, his parents encouraged him to enter a relative's textile business. At this time Gandhi was organizing a boycott of foreign cloth, and protesters were collecting foreign cloth to burn it; Vidyalankar could not, in good conscience, continue selling foreign cloth.

Lala Lajpat Rai issued a call to young Indian men in his English weekly People, telling them that even if they advanced according to colonial standards in commerce and business, they would still bear the stigma of citizenship of a "slave nation"; their first duty was to free the motherland. He founded the Servants of the People Society, whose members pledged to work for the country for five years.

Lal Bahadur Shastri, Balwantrai Mehta, Harihar Nath Shastri, Purushottam Das Tandon and about 20 others, including Vidyalankar, became life members of the society. He worked in the organization from 1926 to 1946, when it was announced that India would become independent in August 1947. Lala Lajpat Rai gave Vidyalankar the job of teaching history at Lahore National College. In this position he came to know Bhagat Singh and his young associates, most of whom were graduates of the college. According to Vidyalankar, "Sardar Bhagat Singh was full of humor, and his heart was pulsating with the anxiety to serve India at all costs. He wanted to do something tangible to arouse the sentiments of the patriotic youth". Others, including Sukhdev Thapar and Yashpal, founded Naujawan Bharat Sabha to further the cause of Indian independence.

After the National College closed Vidyalankar worked with the Harijan, and Lala Lajpat Rai sent him to Hissar in the state of Haryana for six months to assist famine victims in remote areas. In Haryana he worked in the labour movement, edited the Hindi weekly Punjab Kesari and in 1931 was sentenced to two years in jail for his editorial on the failure of the Round Table Conferences.  Two years before Lala Lajpat Rai's death Vidyalankar was his secretary, helping him revise some of his works (particularly his history books) and witnessing the baton charge by the police which may have contributed to his death.

During the Hindu-Muslim clashes of the post-independence period, Vidyalankar was general secretary of the district congress in Amritsar. With other Congress Party workers, he organized rescue squads of Hindus and Muslims for people of both communities and organized refugee camps.

For a number of years Vidyalankar was president of the Punjab branch of the Indian National Trade Union Congress, organizing industrial and agricultural workers in Lahore and Amritsar. In Amritsar he organized Kissan schools, study circles and seminars. Vidyalankar was jailed three times: in 1931–32, 1941–42 and 1942-1945 (when he, Gandhi and others were arrested on 9 August, launching the Quit India Movement).

Post-independence political career 
In 1949, Vidyalankar was appointed by Rajendra Prasad (later the first President of India) permanent secretary in the All India Congress Committee (AICC) office in Delhi. After a little more than a year, Vallabhbhai Patel asked him to run for the Punjab Assembly. Winning the seat by a large margin, Vidyalankar resigned as AICC permanent secretary.  

In 1951 he stood in the first Indian parliamentary election as the Indian National Congress candidate from Jullundur against Shiromani Akali Dal candidate Ajit Singh Sarhaddi, winning by a wide margin.
In 1956 Vidyalankar won the Punjab Legislative Assembly from Jagadhri, and was asked to serve as a minister. From 1957 to 1962, he was Minister of Education, Labor and Languages and Health for the State of Punjab under Chief Minister Pratap Singh Kairon.

In 1957 the central government sent Vidyalankar to an international labor conference in Geneva as chairman of the Indian delegation, and he chaired a goodwill mission to Yugoslavia. In 1961, he went to Afghanistan as chairman of the Indian goodwill mission during the country's national celebration. Vidyalankar was invited by the All India Federation of Educational Associations to deliver addresses to their annual sessions.

In 1962, he won the parliamentary election from Hoshiarpur.

In 1971, Vidyalankar stood for parliament from Chandigarh and was elected for a third time. During this period, he chaired three parliamentary committees appointed by the government: committees to study and improve the Information and Broadcasting Department and the Department of Supply and Disposal and a committee to study the national library in Calcutta. Vidyalankar was a member of the Public Accounts Committee, the Estimates Committee and the Committee on Public Undertakings.

In 1977, he decided not to continue in the legislature and informed Indira Gandhi that he no longer wished to pursue elected office due to the death of his eldest son in a plane crash and his need to care for his family and business. Vidyalankar was active in the Indian National Congress until his death in 1985.

Writings 
During his imprisonment during the 1930s and 1940s, Vidyalankar led worker study circles on political, social and economic subjects. He believed that workers should develop an Indian national feeling, regarding every Indian (regardless of caste, creed, language or ethnicity) as a brother. While he was in jail, he wrote four books in Hindi (Aaj Ki Duniya, Aaj Ka Manav Sansar, Bharat Ka Naya Itihas and Manav Sangharsh) and one  in English (Evolution and Progress of the Human Race). Vidyalankar
later wrote National Integration and the Teaching of History.

References

External links 
 Election Commission of India
 Official website of the Parliament of India

1901 births
1985 deaths
People from Sargodha District
Indian National Congress politicians
India MPs 1952–1957
India MPs 1962–1967
India MPs 1971–1977
Prisoners and detainees of British India